Jörg Helmdach (born 28 November 1964) is a German wrestler. He competed in the men's freestyle 62 kg at the 1988 Summer Olympics.

References

1964 births
Living people
German male sport wrestlers
Olympic wrestlers of West Germany
Wrestlers at the 1988 Summer Olympics
Sportspeople from Dortmund